Jodi is a feminine given name which may refer to:

People
 Jodi Albert (born 1983), English actress
 Jodi Anasta (born 1985), Australian actress and model
 Jodi Anderson (born 1957), American heptathlete
 Jodi Appelbaum-Steinbauer (born 1956), American professional tennis player
 Jodi Applegate (born 1964), American news anchor
 Jodi Arias (born 1980), perpetrator of the murder of Travis Alexander
 Jodi Benson (born 1961), American voice actress and singer
 Jodi Brown (born 1981), New Zealand international netball representative
 Jodi Carlisle (born 1960), American actress
 Jodi DiPiazza (born 2001) American musical prodigy
 Jodi Huisentruit (born 1968), American television news anchor whose disappearance is an unsolved mystery
 Jodi Jones (died 2013), British female murder victim
 Jodi Jones (footballer) (born 1997), English professional footballer
 Jodi Kantor (born 1975), American journalist
 Jodi Long (born 1954), Asian American actress
 Jodi Magness (born 1956), American biblical scholar
 Jodi Martin (born 1976), Australian singer-songwriter
 Jodi McKay (born 1969), Australian politician and television presenter
 Jodi Leigh Miller (born 1972), American female bodybuilder and figure competitor
 Jodi Lyn O'Keefe (born 1978), American actress and model
 Jodi Ann Paterson (born 1975), American model, actress and former beauty queen
 Jodi Phillis (born 1965), Australian singer-songwriter
 Jodi Picoult (born 1967), American author
 Jodi Proznick (born 1975), Canadian jazz bassist
 Jodi Rell (born 1946), former Governor of Connecticut
 Jodi Santamaria (born 1982), Filipina actress
 Jodi Shilling (born 1979), American actress
 Jodi Thelen (born 1962), American actress
 Jodi Thomas, American author
 Jodi Tymeson (born 1955), Member of the Iowa House of Representatives
 Jodi Vaughan (born 1950), country singer, songwriter, recording artist and television performer
 Jodi White, Canadian politician, Chief of Staff to Prime Minister Kim Campbell in 1993
 Jodi Wille, American book editor, filmmaker and photographer

Fictional characters
 Jodi Lerner, on the television series The L Word

Art
 Jodi (art collective)

See also
 Jodie (disambiguation)
 Jody (given name)

English feminine given names
English-language feminine given names